Grégory Lorenzi (born 17 December 1983) is a French former professional footballer defender. During his professional career, he played in particular for Stade Brestois 29. and for SSV Jahn Regensburg. At the end of the 2015–16 season, he became sports director at Brest.

References

External links
 

1983 births
Living people
Sportspeople from Bastia
French footballers
French expatriate footballers
Association football defenders
Royal Excel Mouscron players
SC Bastia players
Stade Brestois 29 players
AC Arlésien players
R.A.E.C. Mons players
SSV Jahn Regensburg players
Belgian Pro League players
Ligue 1 players
Ligue 2 players
3. Liga players
Expatriate footballers in Belgium
Corsica international footballers
Footballers from Corsica